Conceição do Jacuípe is a municipality in the state of Bahia in the North-East region of Brazil

Neighboring municipalities

Amélia Rodrigues
Coração de Maria
Santo Amaro
Feira de Santana
Terra Nova
Teodoro Sampaio

See also
List of municipalities in Bahia

References

Municipalities in Bahia